John Selman (died 1426), of Plympton Erle and Newnham, Devon, was an English politician.

Family
He had an illegitimate son who was also MP for Plympton Erle, John Selman.

Career
He was a Member (MP) of the Parliament of England for Plympton Erle in January 1390, 1391, 1394, 1406 and 1411.

References

14th-century births
1426 deaths
English MPs January 1390
English MPs 1391
English MPs 1394
English MPs 1406
English MPs 1411
Members of the Parliament of England for Plympton Erle